Kesinga railway station is a railway station on the East Coast Railway network in the state of Odisha, India. It serves Kesinga town. Its code is KSNG. It has four platforms. Passenger, Express and Superfast trains halt at Kesinga railway station.

Trains

The following major trains halt at Kesinga railway station in both directions:

 Rourkela–Jagdalpur Express
 Visakhapatnam–Bhagat Ki Kothi Express
 Korba–Visakhapatnam Express
 Dhanbad–Alappuzha Express
 Hatia–Bangalore Cantonment Express
 Tatanagar–Yesvantpur Weekly Express
 Hatia–Yesvantpur Superfast Express
 Ratna Express
 Dharti Aaba AC Superfast Express
 Puri–Ahmedabad Express
 Gandhidham–Puri Weekly Express
 Tatanagar–Yesvantpur Superfast Express
 Sambalpur–Rayagada Intercity Express
 Bilaspur–Tirupati Express
 Samata Express
 Samaleshwari Express
 Visakhapatnam–Lokmanya Tilak Terminus Superfast Express
 Nagavali Express
 Durg–Jagdalpur Express

See also
 Kalahandi district

References

Railway stations in Kalhandi district
Sambalpur railway division